Women is a 1997 internationally co-produced drama film directed by . The film was selected as the Luxembourgish entry for the Best Foreign Language Film at the 70th Academy Awards, but was not accepted as a nominee.

Plot summary

Cast
 Miou-Miou as Eva
 Carmen Maura as Linda
 Marthe Keller as Barbara
 Marisa Berenson as Chloé
 Guesch Patti as Branca
 Joaquim de Almeida as Gigi
 Didier Flamand as Edgar

See also
 List of submissions to the 70th Academy Awards for Best Foreign Language Film
 List of Luxembourgish submissions for the Academy Award for Best Foreign Language Film

References

External links
 
 
 

1997 films
1997 drama films
Belgian drama films
French drama films
Luxembourgian drama films
1990s French-language films
French-language Belgian films
1990s French films